The following lists events that happened during 1960 in Singapore.

Statistics

Births
There were 61770 recorded births

Deaths
There were 10210 recorded deaths.

Incumbents
Yang di-Pertuan Negara – Yusof Ishak
Prime Minister – Lee Kuan Yew

Events

February
 1 February – The Housing and Development Board is set up by Lim Kim San, replacing the Singapore Improvement Trust. The Planning Authority takes over SIT's functions of land use in Singapore.

July
 1 July – The People's Association is formed.

September
 6 September – The National Library launches a new mobile library service.
 8 September – Tan Howe Liang wins a silver medal during the 1960 Summer Olympics.

November
 12 November – The Old National Library Building (demolished in 2004) was opened.

Date unknown
– Far East Organization, a property developer was founded.

Births
 7 January – Hong Huifang, actress.
 24 January – Jack Neo, film director.
 17 March – Ruth Langsford, presenter in the United Kingdom.
 29 March – Paddy Chew, actor (d. 1999).
 20 June – Jeremy Monteiro, singer.
 19 August – Wee Siew Kim, former politician.
 24 November – Shirley Ng, sports shooter.
 Isa Kamari, author.

See also
List of years in Singapore

References

 
Singapore
Years in Singapore